Akkarfjord may refer to:

Akkarfjord (Kvaløya) (Northern Sami: Áhkárvuotna), a small settlement on the island of Kvaløya in the municipality of Hammerfest, Norway
Akkarfjord (Sørøya), a fishing village on the island of Sørøya in the municipality of Hammerfest, Norway